Los Andes is one of the twenty provinces in the central parts of the Bolivian La Paz Department. The province was legally founded on November 24, 1917, during the presidency of José Gutiérrez Guerra. The Spanish name of the province means "The Andes", referring to its position within the Cordillera Real which is part of the Bolivian Andes mountain range. The capital of the province is Pucarani, which has a population of 918 as of the 2001 census. Pucarani is situated in the Altiplano west of the Cordillera Real offering a view of some of its highest mountains such as Ch'iyar Juqhu, Chachakumani, Kunturiri, Wayna Potosí and Chacaltaya.

Location 
The province is located between 16° 00' and 16° 47' South and between 68° 08' and 68° 45' West. It extends over 90 km from north to south, and 75 km from east to west.

It is situated on the south-eastern shores of Lake Titicaca and borders Omasuyos Province in the northwest, Ingavi Province in the south, Pedro Domingo Murillo Province in the east and Larecaja Province in the north.

Geography 
One of the highest peaks of the province is Kunturiri. Other mountains are listed below:

Population 
The population of the Los Andes Province has increased by 20% over the recent two decades:
1992: 62,185 inhabitants (census)
2001: 69,636 inhabitants (census)
2005: 74,693 inhabitants (est.)
2010: 76,181 inhabitants (est.)

96.2%  of the population speak Aymara, 63.8% speak Spanish, and 0.1% Quechua. (2001) Most of the people are bilingual, they speak Aymara and Spanish.

The literacy rate of the province's population is 81.1%, with 90.6% among males and 72.4% among females. (2001)

Infant mortality from 1992 (6.8%) to 2001 (7.3%) has remained high over that decade.

63.5% of the population have no access to electricity, 70.1% have no sanitary facilities. (2001)

57.5% of the households have a radio, 13.0% a TV-set, 32.4% a bike, 1.1% a motorbike, 2.5% a car, 0.4% a fridge, 0.9% a phone. (2001)

71.5% of the population are Catholics, 24.2% are Protestants. (1992)

Division 
The province comprises four municipalities which are further subdivided into cantons.

Places of interest 

Suriki Island is known for the construction of balsas, totora boats which are still used on Lake Titicaca in Bolivia and Peru. The Ra II is famous for Thor Heyerdahl's successful trans-Atlantic voyage from Morocco to Barbados.

See also 
 Allqa Quta
 Ch'iyar Juqhu River
 Ch'iyar Quta
 Juri Quta
 Taypi Chaka Quta

References

External links 
Population data (Spanish)
Social data (Spanish)

Provinces of La Paz Department (Bolivia)